Octavian Nemescu (born March 29, 1940, Paşcani - died November 6, 2020, Bucuresti) was a Romanian composer of orchestral, chamber, choral, electroacoustic, multimedia, metamusic, imaginary, and ritual works that have been heard throughout Europe and elsewhere. 

From 1956 to 1963 Nemescu studied at the National University of Music Bucharest composition with Mihail Jora, harmony with Paul Constantinescu and orchestration with Alexandru Pascanu and Anatol Vieru. In 1972 he participated in the Darmstadt summer courses. From 1971 to 1978 he taught music analysis and counterpoint at the Transilvania University of Braşov. Until 1990 he was professor of counterpoint, harmony and music history at the School of Art "George Enescu" in Iaşi. Since then he was a professor of composition at the National University of Music in Bucharest. He is the father of the Romanian film director Cristian Nemescu (1979-2006).

Awards
For his compositions he received the Aaron Copland Prize, several times the prize of the Romanian Composers Union, two prizes at the Concours International de Musique Électroacoustique de Bourges (1980 and 1982), the prize of the Romanian Academy of Arts and Sciences (1981) and the prize of the International Confederation for Electroacoustic Music (ICEM, 1985).

Works 
Sonata for Clarinet and Piano, 1962
Triangle, 1963-64
Combinations in Circles for cello ensemble and tape, 1965
Four Dimensions in Time - IV, 'Illuminations' for mixed choir and orchestra, 1967
Four Dimensions in Time - V, '1918', 1968
Suggestions multimedia performance, 1968
Memorial multimedia performance, 1968
The King Will The multimedia performance, 1968
Grafological music, multimedia performance, 1969
Concentric for ensemble and tape, 1969
Four Dimensions in Time - VII # ', 1970
Semantics for n melomen, 1971-74
Ulysses, multimedia performance in 1972
Naturel - Culturel for tape, 1973
Spectacle, pour un instant for piano, ensemble and tape, 1974
Cromoson - Song of Objects, 1974-75
Will You Be Able by Yourself ?, 1976
Salve Regina for mixed choir and organ, 1981
Gradeatia for tape; 1982
Metabizantinirikon, for clarinet, violin and tape, 1985
Centrifuga for piano and tape, 1986
Trisson for tape, 1986
Sonatu (h) r for tape, 1987
Alpha - Omega for saxophone (s), violin, percussion and tape, 1988
IN PAR for trombone and tape, 1988
Lumina lina for mixed choir, 1988
NonSymphony No. 5, 1988-92
Alpha - Omega recidiva, 1989
Finalis-septima for clarinet, bassoon, violin, cello, piano and percussion, 1989
Finalpha for trombone, percussion and tape, 1990
Finaleph, 1990
String Quartet for Midnight, 1993
Quindecimortuorum for 1 o'clock AM for two percussionists and Wind Orchestra, 1994
DanielPentAbsorbOR for saxophone (s) and tape, 1995
Negantidiadua for 2 o'clock AM for voice, alto saxophone, trombone, piano, percussion and tape, 1995
Comme je dis for voice and piano, 1996
PhosisTripercMetaMor for 3 o'clock AM for English horn, percussion and tape, 1996
PreSymphony No. 6, 1996-2000
Septuor for 4 o'clock AM for oboe, clarinet, bassoon, violin, cello, piano, percussion and tape, 1997
Quintabeit for 5 o'clock AM for voice, oboe, clarinet, bassoon, two trumpets, violin, cello, piano, percussion and tape, 1998
Beitsonorum for 6 o'clock AM for oboe, clarinet, bassoon, violin, cello, piano, percussion and tape, 1999
Beitintervallum for 7 o'clock AM for clarinet, violin, piano, percussion and tape, 2000
Saecula - Saeculorum for tape, 2000
Beitrissonum for 8 o'clock AM for two flutes, violin, viola, accordion and tape, 2001
PostSymphony No. 2, 2001
PluriSymphony No. 1 for mixed choir and orchestra, 2002
RouaUruauor for 9 o'clock AM for flute, tuba, piano, percussion and tape, 2002
OUA for 10 o'clock AM for flute, clarinet, trombone, violin, piano, percussion and tape, 2002-03
PostSymphony No. 3, 2003

External links
 Artistic biography, list of works and other

Romanian composers
2020 deaths
1940 births
People from Pașcani